Pradhania (named after Dhuiya Pradhan, a fossil collector at the Indian Statistical Institute) is a genus of massospondylid sauropodomorph dinosaur from the Sinemurian-age (Early Jurassic) Upper Dharmaram Formation of India. It was first named by T. S. Kutty, Sankar Chatterjee, Peter M. Galton and Paul Upchurch in 2007 and the type species is Pradhania gracilis. It was a sauropodomorph of modest size, only about four meters (13 ft) long, and is known from fragmentary remains. It was originally regarded as a basal sauropodomorph but new cladistic analysis performed by Novas et al., 2011 suggests that Pradhania is a massospondylid. Pradhania presents two synapomorphies of Massospondylidae recovered in their phylogenetic analysis.

References 

Massospondylidae
Dinosaurs of India and Madagascar
Early Jurassic dinosaurs of Asia
Sinemurian life
Fossil taxa described in 2007
Taxa named by Sankar Chatterjee
Taxa named by Peter Galton